The 1939 Copa Aldao was the final match to decide the winner of the Copa Aldao, the 12th. edition of the international competition organised by the Argentine and Uruguayan Associations together. The final was contested by Uruguayan club Nacional and Argentine club Independiente.

The match was played at San Lorenzo Stadium in Buenos Aires, where Independiente achieved a conclusive 5–0 victory over Nacional, winning its second consecutive Copa Aldao Trophy.

Qualified teams

Match details

References

1940 in Argentine football
1940 in Uruguayan football
Club Nacional de Football matches
Club Atlético Independiente matches
Football in Buenos Aires